Oluwatosin Ajibade (born 19 July 1991), better known by his stage name Mr Eazi, is a Nigerian singer, songwriter, and record executive. He is the pioneer of Banku music, a fusion of sound he describes as a mixture of Ghanaian highlife and Nigerian chord progressions and patterns. Mr Eazi relocated to Kumasi in 2008 and enrolled at KNUST, where he began booking artists to perform at college parties. He showed interest in music after recording a guest verse on "My Life", a song that gained traction and became a popular record at KNUST. Mr Eazi released his debut mixtape About to Blow in 2013. He gained an international audience following the release of the Efya-assisted single "Skin Tight". His second mixtape, titled Life Is Eazi, Vol. 1 – Accra To Lagos, was released in 2017.

Early life and education 
Mr Eazi was born in Port Harcourt, the capital and largest city in Rivers State, Nigeria. He grew up in an entrepreneurial home. His mother owned a small business and his father is a pilot. The latter parent established his own private aviation consulting practice. While attending primary school in Lagos, Mr Eazi had a brief stint in the school's choir. During his upbringing, he listened to records his dad would play for the family while having breakfast. At age 16, Mr Eazi relocated to Ghana to further his educational endeavors, enrolling in the mechanical engineering program at Kwame Nkrumah University of Science and Technology (KNUST). Mr Eazi started recording music during his time at KNUST. He contributed guest vocals to the track "My Life", a song that gained traction and became a popular record at KNUST. Prior to that, he established a party and promotion company called Swagger Entertainment. He used this platform to book shows and promote events on the campus of KNUST. When he was 23 years old, he returned to Nigeria and opened his own e-commerce platform. Mr Eazi told The Guardian newspaper he briefly worked for Schlumberger when he returned to Nigeria. He also told the aforementioned newspaper his business ventures included soft drinks import, gold mining, and food distribution. He told Highsnobiety he started about six business ventures. In 2014, Mr Eazi quit being a club promoter after an artist failed to show up for the largest party he attempted to throw. On 7 June 2022, he graduated from Harvard University in Cambridge, USA.

2013–2015: About to Blow and other releases 
Mr Eazi released his 13-track debut mixtape About to Blow in July 2013. It produced two singles: "Pipi Dance" and "Bankulize". The former was released in mid-2012, while the latter was released in 2013. Mr Eazi recorded the mixtape with producer Klu and released it within a week. The Fader magazine descrie mixtape as a "heavily dancehall-leaning SoundCloud playlist". Prior to releasing the mixtape, Mr Eazi worked with producers such as Magnom, Peeweezle, Nshona, Klumonsta, D'Tunes, and E-Kelly. Moreover, he was featured on Stay Jay's "Baby Lace" and Lousika's "Knockout". In 2014, Mr Eazi relocated to Nigeria. He was contacted by UK-based Ghanaian producer Juls, who got a hold of some of his recordings. Due to not being able to locate the audio files of his old recordings, Mr Eazi's attempt at working with Juls stalled for a long time. Mr Eazi eventually retrieved his audio files and sent them to Juls, who made a new beat and created the artwork for the mixtape's second single "Bankulize". The song features vocals from Ghanaian hiplife artist Pappy Kojo and was released in November 2014. The official remix of "Bankulize" features Burna Boy and was released in September 2016. Mr Eazi premiered the remix on Ebro Darden's Beats 1 radio show a month earlier.

In August 2015, Mr Eazi released the dancehall-influenced track "Skin Tight". It features guest vocals from Ghanaian singer Efya and was produced by DJ Juls. In an interview with Complex magazine, Mr Eazi described the song as a "fusion". He said he spoke Ghanaian pidgin on the delivery and used Nigerian melodies. In August 2016, Nigerian record producer Cobhams Asuquo released a rendition of the song. DJ Caise released a house remix of the song in September 2016, while Terry G collaborated with Mr Eazi to release a remix of the song. In April 2017, "Skin Tight" was featured in an ad for the vodka brand Ciroc.

Mr Eazi was featured on Eugy's 2016 hit single "Dance for Me". The Guardian newspaper included the song on its list of the 10 biggest African tracks of 2016. The music video for "Dance for Me" was directed by Vertex and Gabriella Kingsely. Robin Murray of Clash magazine described the song as a "salute to their joint Ghanaian heritage". On 17 June 2016, Mr Eazi released the R&B-inspired "Anointing", a song that features rap vocals from Ghanaian rapper Sarkodie. Mr Eazi first announced plans for the song in May 2016.

2016–2017: GMA snub, Twitter backlash, Accra to Lagos, and record deal 
In February 2016, organizers of the Vodafone-sponsored Ghana Music Awards made a decision not to nominate Mr Eazi in any of its Ghanaian-only categories. According to George Quaye, a spokesperson for Charterhouse, Mr Eazi was disqualified because of his nationality. Quaye also stated that Mr Eazi was only eligible to compete in the African Artiste of the Year category. However, he failed to pick up a nomination in the aforementioned category because the organizers felt that he isn't as big as the other nominees. On 11 January 2017, Mr Eazi tweeted that Ghanaian music has a great influence over present-day Nigerian music. He received heavy backlash after posting the tweet and trended nationwide in both Ghana and Nigeria. On 12 January 2017, Mr Eazi apologized to Nigerians for the comments that he made.

Following his performance at the 2016 Ghana Music Awards, Wizkid announced that he signed Mr Eazi to his imprint Starboy Entertainment.  However, Mr Eazi told Star FM Ghana in July 2017 that he is not officially signed to Starboy. He also told Star FM Ghana that he is only in business with the imprint. Mr Eazi's second mixtape, Life Is Eazi, Vol. 1 – Accra To Lagos, was released on 10 February 2017. The mixtape was initially scheduled for release on 11 February 2017. It debuted at number 4 on the Billboard World Albums chart. The mixtape comprises 14 tracks, including three bonus tracks. Guest artists featured on the mixtape include Tekno, Olamide, Phyno, Mugeez, Medikal, DJ Cuppy, Falz, and Big Lean. Its production was handled by Maleek Berry, Masterkraft, Legendury Beatz, and Young John. Mr Eazi announced on Instagram that the mixtape sold 200,000 copies in pre-orders. While speaking to Julie Adenuga on her Beats 1 radio show, he said the mixtape is a tribute to the two cities that influenced the evolution of his sound.

The mixtape's lead single "Leg Over" was produced by E-Kelly and released on 2 December 2016. The music video for "Leg Over" features cameo appearances from comedian Eddie Kadi, Maleek Berry, and Wizkid. Mr Eazi told Lawrence Burney from Noisey.com that the song is about being taken advantage of in a relationship. He also said the song was leaked and wasn't meant to be a single. Upon its release in December 2016, "Leg Over" inspired numerous dance videos. Gabriel Myers Hansen, a critic and editor whose review was posted on the Music In Africa website, described the song as "gentle and minimalist". Hansen also said it is "freshened by delicate string and percussion placements reminiscent of highlife from decades ago". On 1 February 2017, Mr Eazi released "Tilapia" as the mixtape's second single. It features vocals from Ghanaian hip hop artist Medikal. On 1 March 2017, Mr Eazi released the Sesan-directed music video for "In The Morning". The song features vocals from Toronto rapper Big Lean. On 1 April 2017, Mr Eazi released the Teekay-directed music video for "Fight", a song that features additional vocals from DJ Cuppy. On 7 April 2017, Mr Eazi released the music video for "Business", a song that features vocals from Mugeez of R2Bees.

2019: Coachella and Empawa Africa 
In January 2019, it was announced that Mr Eazi will be performing at the 2019 Coachella Valley Music and Arts Festival. In August 2019, Mr Eazi launched emPawa Africa, a talent incubation initiative designed to nurture and support up-and-coming African artists. Thirty musicians would be enrolled in the first edition and would receive grant and mentorship to scale up their music career. The initiative is also supported by YouTube Music.

In January 2021, Ajibade announced his upcoming EP titled Something Else, set for a 19 February release. On 10 June 2022, Eazi released "Legalize", through emPawa Africa.

Artistry 
Mr Eazi is known for pioneering Banku music, a sound "characterized by percolating rhythms and laid-back vocal delivered in Ghanaian Pidgin English". Mr Eazi's music largely fits into the category of Afrobeats, a contemporary West African pop genre that marries global pop, Dancehall, highlife, and hip-hop. Mr Eazi's music has been described as having an R&B-like quality reminiscent of artists such as Beres Hammond and Gregory Isaacs. Lawrence Burney from Noisey.com stated that Mr Eazi uses his deep voice to "give ballad-like qualities to dance-forward production".

Mr Eazi, has released his second single and art, Personal Baby, off his yet-to-be-titled debut album.

Personal life 
Mr Eazi is known to be dating Temi Otedola, daughter of Nigerian billionaire  Femi Otedola and sister to DJ Cuppy.
 On 10 April 2022, Mr Eazi engaged Temi Otedola.

Discography

Mixtapes 
About to Blow (2013)
Life is Eazi, Vol. 1 – Accra to Lagos (2017)
Life is Eazi, Vol. 2 – Lagos to London (2018)

EPs 
One Day You Will Understand (2020)
Something Else (2021)

Singles

As lead artist

As featured artist

Other charted and certified songs

Awards and nominations

References

External links 

Living people
1991 births
21st-century Nigerian male singers
Singers from Port Harcourt
Yoruba musicians
Kwame Nkrumah University of Science and Technology alumni
English-language singers from Nigeria
Nigerian businesspeople
Yoruba businesspeople
Businesspeople from Rivers State
Mad Decent artists